CD133 antigen, also known as prominin-1, is a glycoprotein that in humans is encoded by the PROM1 gene. It is a member of pentaspan transmembrane glycoproteins, which specifically localize to cellular protrusions. When embedded in the cell membrane, the membrane topology of prominin-1 is such that the N-terminus extends into the extracellular space and the C-terminus resides in the intracellular compartment. The protein consists of five transmembrane segments, with the first and second segments and the third and fourth segments connected by intracellular loops while the second and third as well as fourth and fifth transmembrane segments are connected by extracellular loops. While the precise function of CD133 remains unknown, it has been proposed that it acts as an organizer of cell membrane topology.

Tissue distribution 

CD133 is expressed in hematopoietic stem cells, endothelial progenitor cells, glioblastoma, neuronal and glial stem cells, various pediatric brain tumors, as well as adult kidney, mammary glands, trachea, salivary glands, uterus, placenta, digestive tract, testes, and some other cell types.

Clinical significance 

Today CD133 is the most commonly used marker for isolation of cancer stem cell (CSC) population from different tumors, mainly from various gliomas and carcinomas. Initial studies that showed ability of CD133-positive population to efficiently propagate tumor when injected into immune-compromised mice firstly were performed on brain tumors.  However, subsequent studies have indicated the difficulty in isolating pure CSC populations. CD133+ melanoma cells are considered a subpopulation of CSC and play a critical role in recurrence. Moreover, CD133+ melanoma cells are immunogenic and can be used as an antimelanoma vaccination. In mice the vaccination with CD133+ melanoma cells mediated strong anti-tumor activity that resulted in the eradication of parental melanoma cells. In addition, it has also been shown that CD133+ melanoma cells preferentially express the RNA helicase DDX3X . As DDX3X also is an immunogenic protein, the same anti-melanoma vaccination strategy can be employed to give therapeutic antitumor immunity in mice.

See also 
 Stargardt disease

References

Further reading

External links 
  GeneReviews/NCBI/NIH/UW entry on Retinitis Pigmentosa Overview
 

Molecular biology